Lake Agnes Tea House is a popular destination for hikers and tourists.

Location 
Lake Agnes Tea House is situated on the shores of Lake Agnes.

Lake Agnes was named after the original First Lady of Canada, Lady Agnes MacDonald, and she was the wife of Canada's first Prime Minister, Sir John A. Macdonald. The beauty of Lake Agnes so delighted Lady MacDonald when she visited it in 1886 that it subsequently bore her name.

Both Lake Agnes and the tea house are located in Lake Louise, Alberta, Canada, at an elevation of 2,135 m (7,005 ft) above sea level.

History 
The Lake Agnes Tea House was built in 1901 by the Canadian Pacific Railway as a refuge for hikers. It started serving tea in 1905 and has been called the oldest teahouse in Canada.

The original log building was replaced in 1981. The new structure features windows, tables, and chairs from the original building.

The Lake Agnes Tea House reflects a longstanding “Canadian” appreciation for the outdoors. The facility also demonstrates an appreciation of tea, an internationally enjoyed beverage.

Tourism 
The famous Lake Agnes Tea House is only accessible on foot or horseback through what is informally called the Lake Agnes Tea House Trail. Lake Agnes Tea House staff carry fresh food supplies to the teahouse daily. Dry goods (e.g flour, sugar, oats, propane) are flown in annually by helicopter.

Before arriving at the spectacular lake and tea house, visitors must complete a forested 3.5 km hike. The Lake Agnes Tea House hike has an elevation gain of 400 m (1,300 ft). The trail itself is marked and trafficked, making it easy to navigate. Although the trail is clear, hikers should dress (e.g., running shoes) and bring provisions (e.g., water) as appropriate.  

Lake Agnes Tea House is open from June to October; the teahouse is not operational in the cold winter months.

The Tea House Challenge 
Many keen hikers take on the “Tea House Challenge.” This challenge involves visiting the Lake Agnes Tea House and Plain of Six Glaciers Tea House in one day. The two tea houses connect via the Highline trail, forming a 14.6-kilometre loop. It takes around 5 hours of hiking to complete.

Beehive Hike 

Those who hike to Lake Agnes Tea House may also choose to complete the Beehive Hike. The Beehive Hike in Lake Louise is a 10.9 kilometer heavily trafficked trail loop.

One hiker, Benjamin Hosch, shares commentary on The Big Beehive Trail on AllTrails:“There's an amazing view that is totally worth it! The trail starts getting steeper going around the back of Lake Agnes”.

You can see the Fairmont Chateau Lake Louise from the top of the Big Beehive, from a vantage point called “Devils Thumb” via the Lake Agnes trail.  The Little Beehive offers similarly striking views.

Another hiker Danielle Pindar, shares commentary of Devils Thumb Via Lake Agnes Trail on AllTrails: “Best views at the top! Pretty tricky going up - not for the faint of heart or weak knees. Dicey at parts but entirely worth it for the view. Stopped at the tea house for lunch - a must do!”

Menu 
The Lake Agnes Tea House serves 100 types of loose leaf tea, coffee, and hot chocolate, among other drinks. Such drinks pair well with their wide offering of sweet treats (e.g., scones with jam, loaves, and apple crumble).

The establishment also offers soups (e.g., tomato vegetable barley) and sandwiches (e.g., tuna salad sandwich), and snacks (e.g., chips, salsa, and homemade hummus).

One visitor to the Lake Agnes Tea House, Cynthia Beer, noted: "Their Tuna sandwich is really good. I also appreciate the sheer effort they have gone and still go through to have an eatery up in the mountains."

Recognition 
The Lake Agnes Tea House is widely recognized as a tourist destination. Lake Agnes Tea House's popularity among Calgarians, Canadians and international tourists is so high that it's one of the top-rated tourist attractions in Banff National Park.

The Lake Agnes Tea House has also received glowing praise from members of the tea community.

One influential tea blogger, Lu Ann Pannunzio, notes in a blog post: “The tea was everything I wanted in a breakfast blend — robust black tea and great with a splash of milk. At the time, milk and sugar were provided in the cup when requested. There was not an option to add it yourself.”Tea sommelier Mackenzie Bailey notes in a Google review:"For tea lovers who enjoy hiking, Lake Agnes Tea House provides a genuinely Canadian tea drinking experience. Because the Lake Agnes Tea House offers a wide selection of premium loose leaf teas prepared using glacier-fed water, you're in for a treat."The establishment has been featured in national media such as The Toronto Star and Calgary Herald, and the provincial government profiles it in Travel Alberta.

Wildlife 
Hikers traveling up to Lake Agnus are likely to see some wildlife including birds and squirrels. Once you complete your hike and reach the Lake Agnus Tea House, you're likely going to see many golden-mantled ground squirrels. These squirrels are accustomed to people, curious, and may approach you. If the squirrels approach you, watch your valuables (e.g. food, phone).

Cera Z, a visitor to the lake Agnus Tea house noted in a Google review:"Nutcracker and magnificent Steller's Jays can be seen. Nature at its best."

External links 
 Official website

References

Hotels in Alberta
Tea houses
Buildings and structures in Banff National Park